Subcarpați (the name is Romanian for the Romanian portion of Subcarpathia) is a Romanian hip-hop band from Bucharest. Formed in 2010 by MC Bean (Alexe Marius Andrei), the band blends hip-hop with elements from Romanian folk music. The genre seeks to reinterpret popular motifs specific to Romanian's folk music, and is often referred to as "underground folklore".

The project had brought together various artists: Surorile Osoianu, Motanu', Faust, AFO, DJ Power Pe Vinil, Esqu, Argatu', and other collaborators.

The British newspaper The Guardian described Subcarpați as being "an explosive mixture of old and new. It's an eclectic combination that brings together melancholy Romanian folk songs, Romanian unity songs, traditional instruments and the rhythms of trip-hop, dubstep, hip-hop and dancehall."

Discography 
Albums
 Subcarpați (2010)
 Underground Folclor (2012)
 Pielea de găină (2014)
 Satele Unite ale Balcanilor (2016)
 Zori și Asfințit (2018)

References

External links 
 
 Official Facebook page
 Official Soundcloud page

Romanian hip hop groups
Musical groups established in 2010
Romanian electronic music groups
2010 establishments in Romania
Musical groups from Bucharest